Tamerton Foliot was a railway station,  built by the Plymouth, Devonport and South Western Junction Railway (PDSWJR) on its line from  to  and  on the section that is now the Tamar Valley Line.

History
The station was a later addition to the PDSWJR route (the line having opened in 1890), the original intention had been to build a branch line to serve the village of Tamerton Foliot but this scheme was not proceeded with, and a passenger only station on the main line was opened instead in 1897. In 1936, Southern Railway figures showed it was the company's least used station west of Salisbury with less than 1000 passenger journeys in the year.

The station had two platforms and as well as the normal facilities of a booking office, parcels office and waiting rooms also had accommodation for a station master, although in later years the station was staffed by just a single porter and eventually became an unstaffed halt.

The station closed in 1962.

References
Notes

Sources

Disused railway stations in Devon
Former Plymouth, Devonport and South Western Junction Railway stations
Railway stations in Great Britain opened in 1897
Railway stations in Great Britain closed in 1962
Bickleigh, South Hams